Dr. Hui Liu is a Chinese American professor and an entrepreneur in the field of wireless and satellite communications. He is a prolific researcher with more than 200 scholarly articles and 2 textbooks, and a creative innovator with 67 awarded patents in areas ranging from wireless systems, signal processing, satellite networks, to machine learning. He has more than 12,000 paper citations and an H-index of 56 as of 2018. Dr. Liu is also one of the principal designers of three industrial standards on cellular networks, terrestrial broadcasting, and satellite communications, respectively.

Biography
Liu graduated from Fudan University of Shanghai, China with B.Sc degree in electrical engineering in 1988 and obtained master's degree at Portland State University. By 1995 he completed his Ph.D. in the same field as well from the University of Texas at Austin. From September of the same year till July 1998 Liu worked at the University of Virginia as a tenure-track Assistant Professor. After that, he joined the Electrical Engineering department of University of Washington where he became a tenure Full Professor and the Associate Chair of Research. From 2013 to 2016, he was the ZhiYuan Chair Professor and the Associate Dean at School of Electronic, Information & Electrical Engineering (SEIEE) at Shanghai Jiao Tong University.
. He worked as a chief scientist at Cwill Telecom and was one of the principal designers of the 3G TD-SCDMA technologies. He founded Adaptix in 2000 and pioneered the development of OFDMA-based mobile broadband cellular networks (mobile WiMAX and 4G LTE).  He is the President and CTO of Silkwave Holdings Limited.

Inventor

 Dr. Liu is the Architect of the terrestrial broadcasting technology in the China Multimedia Mobile Broadcasting networks
 He is the author of the 6 original patents on TD-SCDMA, one of the ITU standards on mobile cellular networks. He won the Gold Prize Patent Award for his patent on "Smart Antenna CDMA Wireless Communication Systems," U. S. Patent 6,122,260.
 Currently he is the CTO and Vice Chairman of Silkwave Holdings and CMMB Vision, a listed company in Hong Kong,  developing the world's first satellite direct-to-mobile (DTM) multimedia network that delivers Cloud-based video, audio entertainment and data services to vehicles and mobile devices that is data-free, abundant, and ubiquitous.

Awards
In 1997 the National Science Foundation awarded Liu with the NSF Early Faculty CAREER Award;  In 2000 he became a recipient of the Young Investigator Award from the Office of Naval Research. During the same year, with the help of Artech House he published his Signal Processing Applications in CDMA Communications book and five years later published another one which was called OFDM-Based Broadband Wireless Networks – Design and Optimization. Before he published his second book through Wiley he was twice nominated for the IEEE Best Paper Award and became the recipient of the Gold Prize Patent Award for his patent on 3G TD-SCDMA . Liu has received multiple IEEE Best Conference Paper Award and in 2008 he was honored to be an IEEE Fellow "for contributions to global standards for broadband cellular and mobile broadcasting".

References

Living people
20th-century births
Chinese electrical engineers
American inventors
Fudan University alumni
University of Washington faculty
Year of birth missing (living people)
American electrical engineers
Chinese emigrants to the United States
Portland State University alumni
University of Texas at Austin alumni
Electrical engineering academics
Chinese inventors
University of Virginia faculty
Academic staff of Shanghai Jiao Tong University